Nemesbük is a village in Zala County, Hungary.

External links 

Populated places in Zala County